"Boss Bitch" is a song by American rapper and singer Doja Cat, featured on the Birds of Prey soundtrack Birds of Prey: The Album (2020). It was released as the soundtrack's third single on January 23, 2020. The song was written by Doja Cat alongside Ashnikko and producers Sky Adams & Imad Royal.

Composition
"Boss Bitch" is an "uptempo record" combined with a "poppy feel mixing layers of synths and cowbells". The lyrical content was described as a "fiery clapback at her haters". Doja Cat credited Ashnikko with writing the first verse and herself with writing the second.

Critical reception
"Boss Bitch" was met with positive reviews from music critics. Patrick Johnson at Hypebeast described Doja's rendition as "a club-leaning single that features dubbing synths, unexpected cowbells and an undeniable chorus" and commented on her performance as "exuding the confidence and anti-good girl swagger of the film's protagonist Harley Quinn". James Dinh at iHeartRadio compared Doja's charisma to early Nicki Minaj with lyrics that "give the rising star more reason to gain attention", while Brendan Wetmore from Paper stated that the song was more reminiscent of Azealia Banks' "more bass-heavy works". As part of the soundtrack review, Jazz Tangcay of Vulture labeled the album opener as "declaratory" with a hook that exudes the singer's "bad-ass determination".

In June 2020, the song was listed as the 27th best song of 2020 so far by Billboard. NME named it the 12th best song of 2020 in December.

Music video
Doja Cat posted pictures of herself at the video set in December 2019. The accompanying music video was released on January 23, 2020, and features previously unseen footage of the then-unreleased Birds of Prey, as well as shots of Doja Cat fighting off enemies and moving around a dance floor with Harley. Scenes featuring the singer were directed by Jack Begert, who also directed the videos for "Juicy" and "Cyber Sex".

Credits and personnel
Credits adapted from Birds of Prey: The Album liner notes.
 
Recording
 Mixed and Mastered at Larrabee Sound Studios (North Hollywood, California)

Personnel

Doja Cat – vocals, songwriting
Ashton Casey – songwriting
Sky Adams – songwriting; production
Imad Royal – songwriting, production
Manny Marroquin – mixing
Michelle Mancini – mastering

Charts

Weekly charts

Year-end charts

Certifications

Release history

References

2020 singles
2020 songs
Doja Cat songs
DC Extended Universe music
Songs written by Doja Cat
Songs written by Ashnikko
Electropop songs